The Abbottabad Falcons was a Pakistani men's professional Twenty20 cricket team that competes in the Haier T20 League and based in Abbottabad, Khyber Pakhtunkhwa, Pakistan. The Falcons played at the Abbottabad Cricket Stadium, which the Pakistan Cricket Board declared a first-class ground in 2010.

History
The Falcons were formed in 2005 as the "Abbottabad Rhinos", but renamed themselves to the Abbottabad Falcons during the 2010-11 season.

Seasons

Note: * indicates participations as Abbotabad Rhinos.

See also
 Peshawar Panthers
 Pakistan Super League

References

External links
Twenty 20 Record page for Abbottabad Falcons/Rhinos
Cricketarchive page for Abbottabad Falcons
Cricketarchive page for Abbottabad Rhinos

Cricket clubs established in 2006
2006 establishments in Pakistan
Cricket teams in Pakistan
Falcons